Minneapolis Japanese School (MJS; ミネアポリス日本語補習授業校 Mineaporisu Nihongo Hoshū jugyō kō) is a Japanese weekend school in the Minneapolis-St. Paul area.

It is a nonprofit organization whose mission is to teach Pre-K through 12th Grade children the Japanese language, culture and traditions in order to enrich cross-cultural skills.  Classes are currently held on Saturdays at Mounds Park Academy in Maplewood, Minnesota. The mailing address is in Woodbury.

The school previously held its classes at the Minneapolis College of Art and Design in Minneapolis.

As of 2011 the school engages in fundraising during the annual Lantern Lighting Festival.

General Information
The school provides four hours of instruction per week for at least forty weeks during the year, primarily in the areas of Japanese language and mathematics, in accordance with the teaching guidance summary established by the Japanese Ministry of Education. The Japanese government provides schoolbooks free of charge.

References

External links
 Minneapolis Japanese School 
 English information
 Minneapolis Japanese School (Archive) 
 English information (Archive)

Asian-American culture in Minneapolis–Saint Paul
Schools in Minnesota
Minneapolis
Education in Ramsey County, Minnesota
Education in Minneapolis